Südpfalz is an electoral constituency (German: Wahlkreis) represented in the Bundestag. It elects one member via first-past-the-post voting. Under the current constituency numbering system, it is designated as constituency 211. It is located in southern Rhineland-Palatinate, comprising the city of Landau and the districts of Germersheim and Südliche Weinstraße.

Südpfalz was created for the 1965 federal election. Since 2021, it has been represented by Thomas Hitschler of the Social Democratic Party (SPD).

Geography
Südpfalz is located in southern Rhineland-Palatinate. As of the 2021 federal election, it comprises the independent city of Landau and the districts of Germersheim and Südliche Weinstraße.

History
Südpfalz was created in 1965, then known as Landau. It acquired its current name in the 1987 election. In the 1965 through 1976 elections, it was constituency 163 in the numbering system. In the 1980 through 1998 elections, it was number 161. In the 2002 election, it was number 214. In the 2005 election, it was number 213. In the 2009 and 2013 elections, it was number 212. Since the 2017 election, it has been number 211.

Originally, the constituency comprised the city of Landau, and the districts of Landkreis Landau, Germersheim, and Bergzabern. In the 1972 and 1976 elections, it comprised the city of Landau, and the districts of Landau-Bad Bergzabern and Germersheim. It acquired its current borders in the 1980 election.

Members
The constituency has been held by the Christian Democratic Union (CDU) during all but one Bundestag term since its creation. It was first represented by Albert Leicht from 1965 to 1980. Heiner Geißler served from 1980 to 2002. Ralf Göbel was then representative from 2002 to 2009. Thomas Gebhart was elected in 2009, and re-elected in 2013 and 2017. Thomas Hitschler won the constituency for the Social Democratic Party (SPD) in 2021.

Election results

2021 election

2017 election

2013 election

2009 election

Notes

References

Federal electoral districts in Rhineland-Palatinate
1965 establishments in West Germany
Constituencies established in 1965
Landau
Germersheim (district)
Südliche Weinstraße